Grey Griffins is a children's novel series written by the American authors Derek Benz and J. S. Lewis in collaboration.<ref>Official Grey Griffins web site. Retrieved on 4/22/08</ref>

The first trilogy in the series was published by Orchard Books, an imprint of Scholastic Inc. However, the authors signed with Little, Brown Books for Young Readers for the next trilogy.

 Plot 
The Grey Griffins series follows the story of four sixth graders who live in the fictional city of Avalon, Minnesota. These four friends formed a secret order named The Order of the Grey Griffins, consisting of, Grayson Maximillian "Max" Sumner III (the leader) and his friends: Natalia Romanov (the marshal), Ernie Tweeny (the steward), and Harley Eisenstein (the warden). In The Revenge of the Shadow King, the Grey Griffins discover a link between their 'innocent' card game (Round Table) and a magic book (the Codex Spiritus) which Max discovers in his grandmother's attic. The story focuses on the friendship between the four 'Griffins', and their adventures as they stumble upon one dark secret after another and soon learn that the world in which they lived was much more dangerous than they ever believed. With the help of the Knights Templar (a shadowy organization that protects humanity from the monsters and abuses of faerie magic), the Griffins uncover a plot to hand the earth over to the malevolent Shadow King.

In The Rise of the Black Wolf Max and his friends travel to his father's castle in Scotland for Christmas. But even before they arrive, they are attacked by Morgan La Fey, the sorceress they had believed defeated in the previous book. Disaster strikes the Sumner Castle, and Max and his three best friends set off on a round-the-world journey to collect the three scattered pieces of the Spear of Ragnarok.

In The Fall of the Templar, the Black Wolf Army, now under the leadership of Max's father, attack the Templar, plunging the two forces into a covert and shadowy war. But this time, the stakes are larger than just the lives of the soldiers. Lord Sumner, with the Spear of Ragnarok, plans to destroy the world, which he believes to be corrupt, in order for it to be reborn. Once again, the Griffins set off on another treacherous adventure to find answers, this time deep below the surface of the Earth in the Underworld.

List of novels

Main TrilogyThe Revenge of the Shadow KingGrey Griffins Book One
Release date: March 2006The Rise of the Black WolfGrey Griffins Book Two
Release date: January 2007The Fall of the TemplarGrey Griffins Book Three
Release date: January 2008

Clockwork ChroniclesThe Brimstone KeyGrey Griffins: Clockwork Chronicles Book One
Release date: June 7, 2010The Relic HuntersGrey Griffins: Clockwork Chronicles Book Two
Release date: May 10, 2011The Paragon PrisonGrey Griffins: Clockwork Chronicles Book Three
Release date: May 8, 2012

List of major characters

 Grayson Maximillian Sumner III / Max Sumner: Master and Leader of the Secret Order of the Grey Griffins. He is also a wielder of the Codex Spiritus and Sky Fire. 
Ernie Tweeny: Steward of the Grey Griffins, also known as Agent Thunderbolt.
Natalia Romanov: Marhsal of the Grey Griffins. Has a younger sister named Katirina. Natalia loves unicorns and pink and is an extremely good detective.
Harley Davidson Eisenstein: Engineer and Warden of the Grey Griffins. His father left him and mother. 
Logan: Max's security guard and also a Templar
Olaf Iverson: Like a grandfather to the Grey Griffins, Olaf, commonly known as Iver, is their mentor and teacher, teaching them the ways of the Templar through the card game referred to as Round Table 
Morgan La Faye: The Black Witch.
Sprig: Max's Bounder spriggan.
Dr. Diamonte Blackstone: It is rumored that Blackstone had been a musical prodigy with promises of fame and fortune before he mysteriously disappeared. Years later, he resurfaced in the tiny town of Avalon, Minnesota, eager to accept a position as orchestra instructor at King's Elementary School.
Brooke Lundgren: The daughter of Baron Lundgren and the most beautiful girl in school, and Max Sumner's next door neighbor. Like Max, she also has a Bounder Faerie. Her Bounder is a pixie named Honeysuckle. Brooke has a special ability that allows her to heal others and erase memories. She has a crush on Max who she has known since childhood. When they were four years old, Max asked Brooke to marry him. Brooke is the only honorary member of the Grey Griffins. Although Brooke has abilities and her mother was a faerie, she is not a changeling. Brooke is described as having brown wavy hair and brown eyes.
Ray Fisher: Ray is a classmate who has despised Max since the start of the fifth grade. They had been good friends for long time until Ray became jealous of Max and all that he had. Fueled by jealousy, Ray has sworn to make Max's life miserable. Their rivalry is exacerbated when Ray decides to barter with Oberon, the Shadow King. In exchange for otherworldly power, Ray must vow to serve Oberon for the remainder of days. In Ray's opinion, that was hardly a penance for the promise of destroying Max.
Lord Sumner: Max's father. Turns on Max, revealing he was using Max to get the Spear of Raganrok, then Max takes revenge
Annika Sumner: Max's mother. She is not always kind to Max, but her intentions are secretly for the best. 
Hannah Sumner: Max's little sister. She never really says much until the last installment of the Grey Griffins series. She can immediately tell that Max is not her actual brother from the alternate universe they are sucked into by the Paragon machine.
Raven Lugosi: While everyone fears the changelings, the changelings fear Raven. She is a Quebecois French Canadian, and does not say much, but rather glares at all the others.
The Custodian: The guardian of the Underworld.

 Reception and criticism 
The Children's Literature Review states that The Revenge of the Shadow King'' is "imaginative" and that "the story's fast-paced, adventure plot is compelling" but that it "lacks depth, as it fails to connect with the larger question asked by great  fantasy literature". The review concludes, "Overall the book is a good read, even if it is not great literature."

References

External links 
 Orchard Books, an imprint of Scholastic Inc.
 Jon S Lewis interview at BookReviewsAndMore.ca

Book series introduced in 2006
American fantasy novels
Fantasy novel series
Modern Arthurian fiction
Collaborative book series